Rocky King Detective (also known as Inside Detective) is an American action/crime drama series that was broadcast live on the DuMont Television Network on Sundays at 9pm ET for most of its run. The series ran for six seasons, from January 7, 1950, to December 26, 1954.  From January 7, 1950, to July 22, 1950, the series was broadcast on Saturdays at 8:30pm ET, and from September 8, 1950, to March 9, 1951, it was broadcast on Fridays at 9:30pm ET, until moving to Sundays.

When the series began in 1950 it was seen on nine DuMont stations, and budget limitations forced its star, Roscoe Karns to change in the men’s restroom. In 1953 it was shown on 45 stations and, after moving production to DuMont’s new Tele-Center, Karns obtained his own dressing room. The series became one of DuMont’s most popular shows, lasting nearly to the end of DuMont’s operations.

Overview

Each episode begins with Roscoe Karns, as the title character, walking down a long hallway towards the camera, as the announcer says “Rocky King, chief of homicide of the Metropolitan Police Force in an exciting fight against crime.” During the first three seasons Earl Hammond portrayed King's partner, Detective Sgt. Lane. During the final two seasons, Karns' real life son Todd portrayed King's partner Detective Hart. Rounding out the cast was Grace Carney as Mabel King.

As an economy measure Carney was heard, but never seen, as the wife of Detective King. DuMont always suffered from limited funds, and in an early episode Carney was asked to play both the detective’s wife and a woman connected to the crime being investigated. Since the thirty-minute series was broadcast live there wasn’t time for Carney to change her clothing and make-up, so she spoke her Mabel lines offscreen. The audience enjoyed the novelty of a character that was never seen, and so Carney continued to speak her lines out of camera range.

The series tried to show an accurate depiction of police work. Detective King and his assistants sometimes missed clues, or failed to arrest suspects in a timely manner, but the audience appreciated that the characters were depicted as being fallible. Roscoe Karnes had met a few detectives, and tried to model his role after them. He stated “The cops I’ve met like Rocky because the show doesn’t ridicule them.”

The series blended dramatic police investigation with humorous banter between Rocky and his wife Mabel; banter which often pertained to their son, Junior. Mabel said foolish things, and nagged her husband, but it was shown that the couple cared for each other. Each episode ended with Rocky calling his wife to say he would soon be home, then he looked at the camera and remarked “Wonderful girl, that Mabel.” Roscoe Karns wrote much of the dialogue between Rocky and Mabel.

Episode status

Of hundreds of Rocky King Detective episodes 38 kinescope copies are archived at the UCLA Film and Television Archive, but 11 of those episodes are marked as being Non-circulating Safety Storage (archival or research) copies.

In 2006 Alpha Home Entertainment released a four episode Rocky King Detective DVD. Several episodes are available for online viewing. Below is information about the most readily accessible episodes.

Selected episodes

See also
List of programs broadcast by the DuMont Television Network
List of surviving DuMont Television Network broadcasts
1951-52 United States network television schedule (Sundays at 9pm ET)
1952-53 United States network television schedule (Sundays at 9pm ET)
1953-54 United States network television schedule (Sundays at 9pm ET)

External links 

 
DuMont historical website
Rocky King episode "Murder Scores a Knockout" (1952) legal download at the Internet Archive
Rocky King episode "Murder PhD" (1953) at Internet Archive
Rocky King episode "The Hermit's Cat" (1952) at TV4U.com

References 

DuMont Television Network original programming
1950s American crime drama television series
1950 American television series debuts
1954 American television series endings
1950s American police procedural television series
American action television series
American live television series
Television shows set in New York City
Black-and-white American television shows
English-language television shows
American detective television series